Mansur-e Aqai (also Romanized as Manşūr-e Āqā’ī and Manşūr Āqā’ī; also known as Manşūrābād) is a village in Mansur-e Aqai Rural District, Shahu District, Ravansar County, Kermanshah Province, Iran. At the 2006 census, its population was 1,987, in 429 families.

References 

Populated places in Ravansar County